John Nderu (18 May 1946 – 17 August 2017) was a Kenyan boxer. He competed in the men's bantamweight event at the 1972 Summer Olympics.

References

External links
 

1946 births
2017 deaths
Kenyan male boxers
Olympic boxers of Kenya
Boxers at the 1972 Summer Olympics
Place of birth missing
Bantamweight boxers
Commonwealth Games medallists in boxing
Commonwealth Games bronze medallists for Kenya
Boxers at the 1966 British Empire and Commonwealth Games
Medallists at the 1966 British Empire and Commonwealth Games